Since the establishment of its current format in 1925,  ten non-League football clubs – that is, clubs outside the divisions of the Football League and, since 1992, the Premier League – have reached the Fifth Round of the FA Cup, to become one of the last 16 clubs in the competition. To date, only Lincoln City has subsequently reached the next round, the "quarter-finals" (formally called the Sixth Round).

The Football League was founded in 1888; prior to this, all teams entered the FA Cup as equals, and random byes were used where required based on the number of clubs entering. A qualifying tournament was introduced in 1888–89, giving priority access to the first round for leading Football League clubs, though stronger non-League teams were also given direct entry, ahead of lower-ranked Football League teams.

After the foundation of the Football League, non-League teams reached the FA Cup Final on four occasions: The Wednesday of the Football Alliance in 1889–90, Southampton of the Southern League in 1899–1900 and 1901–02, and Tottenham Hotspur of the Southern League, who became the only non-League winners in 1900–01. The Football League continued to strengthen over time, and in 1920–21 it expanded to absorb the 20 strongest Southern League teams, followed by the addition of two more southern teams and 18 leading northern non-League clubs the following year. The reformatting of the FA Cup to six rounds before the semi-finals, was introduced a few years later for the 1925–26 FA Cup. Prior to this new format, the last non-League teams to reach the last 16 were Southampton and Queens Park Rangers of the Southern League in 1914–15, after the latter had made the quarter-finals in 1913–14.

Results
Note: Scores show the listed team first, irrespective of the match being home, away, or at a neutral venue.

References

External links
 Past results (official archive), The FA Cup
 Non-league best, The FA Cup, 28 November 2008
 "The five non-league teams to reach FA Cup fifth round before Crawley", Louise Taylor, The Guardian, 18 February 2011
 The FA Cup, Project Fifth Round, David Barber, TheFA.com, 29 January 2011
 Motson's FA Cup Odyssey, John Motson, Robson, 2005, p. 36

FA Cup
FA Cup non-league